Stoke-on-Trent Central is a constituency in Staffordshire. It has been represented by Jo Gideon of the Conservative Party since the general election of 2019.

Members of Parliament

Profile
The contribution of the city to Britain's economy and history is prominent as home to Staffordshire Potteries: Aynsley, Burleigh, Doulton, Dudson, Heron Cross, Minton, Moorcroft, Twyford and Wedgwood, most in this particular seat.

Owing to a reduction in clay and coal excavation works in the area, and canal trade, this seat has the highest unemployment rates of the three Stoke seats; this seat has 6.2% of workless registered unemployment benefit claimants, compared to a national average of 3.8% and regional average of 4.7%.

Boundaries

Since the implementation of the Fifth Periodic Review of Westminster constituencies after the 2005 election the seat has had these electoral wards: 
Abbey Green, Bentilee and Townsend, Berryhill and Hanley East, Hanley West and Shelton, Hartshill and Penkhull, Northwood and Birches Head, and Stoke and Trent Vale in the City of Stoke-on-Trent.

In the initial proposals of the Sixth Periodic Review of Westminster constituencies, the seat would be reshaped and renamed "Stoke-on-Trent South". The proposed seat would comprise the electoral wards of Bentilee and Ubberley, Boothen and Oak Hill, Broadway and Longton East, Eaton Park, Fenton East, Fenton West and Mount Pleasant, Hanley Park and Shelton, Hartshill and Basford, Joiner's Square, Lightwood North and Normacot, Meir Hay, Meir North, Meir Park, Meir South, Penkhull and Stoke, Sandford Hill, Springfields and Trent Vale, and Weston Coyney.

History
The constituency was created for the 1950 general election. The large town had, in succession, two forerunners, the first of which gained representation by way of the "Great Reform Act" in 1832. The constituency has a majority of residents from a clear-cut working-class background, many of whom work or have worked in trade union-represented industries. Of these, many were employed in The Potteries, the smaller foundries or in nearby hubs for the civil infrastructure and automotive industries; the latter of these remains an important source of employment in the region. The constituency's housing—overwhelmingly low-rise, and in some cases highly ornate Victorian terraces and semi-detached houses—is, compared with Staffordshire as a whole, a relatively dense urban network of streets.

Political history
Statistics are confusing as to the current status of the area, reflecting the great demographic—in particular, economic sector—changes in the constituency. Tristram Hunt's result at the 2015 general election gave the seat the 60th-most marginal majority of the Labour Party's 232 seats, measured by percentage of majority. Labour's continuous tenure of Stoke-on-Trent Central from 1950 to 2019 placed it among the approximately 120 constituencies of the 232 which returned Labour members in 2015—all their predecessor areas included—to have withstood landslides for the Conservative Party during the intervening period (such as the 1983 general election). Stoke-on-Trent Central ranked highest for political apathy at the 2015 election, recording the lowest turnout in the United Kingdom.

Prominent members
Barnett Stross was awarded the Order of the White Lion in recognition of his role in the development of relations between the UK and Czechoslovakia, and for his role in the renewal of the substantial village of Lidice; he also led statutory efforts that began specific protection of workers against industrial disease.

Mark Fisher was for 13 months the Minister for the Arts at the outset of the Blair ministry.

Tristram Hunt was the Shadow Secretary of State for Education in the Labour Party's Shadow Cabinet from October 2013 until September 2015.

Elections

Elections in the 2010s

Vote changes are made with reference to the 2015 general election, not to the 2017 by-election.

Elections in the 2000s

Elections in the 1990s

Elections in the 1980s

Elections in the 1970s

Elections in the 1960s

Elections in the 1950s

See also
List of parliamentary constituencies in Staffordshire

References

Parliamentary constituencies in Staffordshire
Politics of Stoke-on-Trent
Constituencies of the Parliament of the United Kingdom established in 1950